Al-Diwaniya Stadium is a multi-use stadium in Al Diwaniyah, Iraq. It is currently used mostly for football matches and is the home stadium of Al-Diwaniya FC. The stadium holds 5,000 spectators.

See also 
List of football stadiums in Iraq

References

Football venues in Iraq
Multi-purpose stadiums in Iraq
Athletics (track and field) venues in Iraq